Tiruchengathangudi  is a village in the Thirumarugal Block in the Nagapattinam District of Tamil Nadu state. It is on the border of the Nagapattinam, Karaikal and Thiruvarur districts.

Demographic
Tamil is the village's local language.

Transport
The closest railway station to Tiruchengathangudi is Nannilam Railway Station and  Punthottam Railway Station. Tiruchengathangudi can also be reachedlace by bus; the nearest bus stops are Thirumarugal, Puragramam, Settur Village and EB.

References

Villages in Nagapattinam district